Conus vautieri, common name Vautier's cone, is a species of sea snail, a marine gastropod mollusk in the family Conidae, the cone snails and their allies.

Like all species within the genus Conus, these snails are predatory and venomous. They are capable of "stinging" humans, therefore live ones should be handled carefully or not at all.

Taxonomic relation 
Conus vautieri was originally named as a subspecies of Conus pulicarius Hwass in Bruguière, 1792, but has been recognized as a valid species, alternative representation in the genus Puncticulis.

Description
The size of the shell varies between 27 mm and 75 mm. The spire is tuberculate. The sides of the body whorl are nearly direct. The color of the shell is white, with chestnut spots, overlaid here and there by lighter chestnut clouds.

Distribution
This species occurs in the Pacific Ocean off the Marquesas and New Caledonia.

References

 Kiener L.C. 1844-1850. Spécies général et iconographie des coquilles vivantes. Vol. 2. Famille des Enroulées. Genre Cone (Conus, Lam.), pp. 1-379, pl. 1-111 [pp. 1-48 (1846); 49-160 (1847); 161-192 (1848); 193-240 (1849); 241-[379](assumed to be 1850); plates 4,6 (1844); 2-3, 5, 7-32, 34-36, 38, 40-50 (1845); 33, 37, 39, 51-52, 54-56, 57-68, 74-77 (1846); 1, 69-73, 78-103 (1847); 104-106 (1848); 107 (1849); 108-111 (1850)]. Paris, Rousseau & J.B. Baillière

External links
 To USNM Invertebrate Zoology Mollusca Collection
 To World Register of Marine Species
 Cone Shells - Knights of the Sea
 

vautieri
Gastropods described in 1845